Siim Avi (born 22 July 1984 in Tartu) is an Estonian politician and lawyer. He has mainly served as an elder of different municipalities. From 2011 to 2013 Avi served as the elder of Piirissaare Parish, from 2016 to 2017 Kõpu Parish and from 2018 to 2019 as the elder of Ruhnu Parish. He does not belong to any party but has described himself as a liberal.

References

1984 births
Living people
21st-century Estonian lawyers
Mayors of places in Estonia
Politicians from Tartu